The EMD SD40-2 is a  C-C diesel-electric locomotive built by EMD from 1972 to 1989.

The SD40-2 was introduced in January 1972 as part of EMD's Dash 2 series, competing against the GE U30C and the ALCO Century 630. Although higher-horsepower locomotives were available, including EMD's own SD45-2, the reliability and versatility of the  SD40-2 made it one of the best-selling models in EMD's history, edged only by the GP9, and the standard of the industry for several decades after its introduction. The SD40-2 was an improvement over the SD40, with modular electronic control systems similar to those of the experimental DDA40X.

Peak production of the SD40-2 was in the mid-1970s. Sales of the SD40-2 began to diminish after 1981 due to the oil crisis, increased competition from GE's Dash-7 series and the introduction of the EMD SD50, which was available concurrently to late SD40-2 production. The last SD40-2 delivered to a United States railroad was built in July 1984, with production continuing for railroads in Canada until 1988, Mexico until February 1986, and Brazil until October 1989.

The SD40-2 has seen service in Canada, Mexico, Brazil and Guinea. To suit export country specifications, General Motors designed the JT26CW-SS (British Rail Class 59) for Great Britain, the GT26CW-2 for Yugoslavia, South Korea, Iran, Morocco, Peru and Pakistan, while the GT26CU-2 went to Zimbabwe and Brazil. Various customizations led Algeria to receive their version of a SD40-2, known as GT26HCW-2.

Appearance and spotting features 

As the SD38, SD39, SD40, and SD45 shared a common frame, so too did the SD38-2, SD40-2, and SD45-2. The SD38-2 and SD40-2 shared the same basic superstructure, since they used the same 16-645 engine (in Roots-blown and turbocharged form respectively); the long hood was  longer than the SD38 and SD40, but since the increase in frame length was even greater, the SD38-2 and SD40-2 had even larger front and rear "porches" than the earlier models. These empty areas at front and rear are spotting features to identify the Dash 2 models of both units. The SD40-2 can be distinguished from the SD38-2 by its three roof-mounted radiator fans instead of two, and a single large exhaust stack instead of two smaller stacks.

The increase in the frame length between the preceding 40 Series and the 40-2 Series six-axle locomotives was made to accommodate the new HT-C truck design, in which the traction motors all face the same direction, making the trucks longer. After a series of derailments involving Amtrak SDP40F units that were equipped with "hollow bolster" HT-C trucks, applied only to the SDP40F, Conrail ordered the SD40-2 units and several orders of SD50s with the older Flexicoil trucks, but the HT-C truck was vindicated and it ultimately went under most 40 Series, 50 Series and 60 Series six-axle locomotives, and this truck is still found under many remanufactured locomotives. 

Some SD45 and SD45-2 units have been modified by replacing their 20-cylinder engine with the 16-cylinder removed from scrapped SD40-2 units; this was common on Union Pacific and possibly other railroads. In many cases these are identified by the owner as SD40-3, SD40M-2 or some such. Confusingly, what appears to be an SD45 is labeled as an SD40-2. Older SD40-2 units used in low-power modes such as yard switching or hump service have been de-turbocharged, resulting in the mechanical equivalent of a SD38-2. Units so modified may or may not be re-labeled. 

There are several variations of the SD40-2 such as the SD40T-2s (Informally: T for tunnel motor; the actual EMD designation is "SD40-2 With Cooling System Modification", as stated on this model's EMD manuals) bought by the former Southern Pacific, and Denver and Rio Grande Western railroads; now operated by Union Pacific. The SD45 tunnel motor equivalent, the SD45T-2 model, was also utilized by Southern Pacific. Many tunnel motors were rebuilt and sold second-hand to a handful of American shortlines including, Bessemer and Lake Erie, Illinois Railway and Missouri and Northern Arkansas, as well as Canadian shortline Goderich-Exeter Railway. There is the SD40-2W (W for the 4-Window Safety Cab) bought and operated by the Canadian National railway. High-nosed versions of the SD40-2 were bought by Norfolk & Western, & Southern Railway. These units are now operated by the Norfolk Southern Railway (Resulting merger of N&W and Southern Railway). A narrow gauge version produced for Ferrovia Central Atlantico in Brazil is the BB40-2. 

Three cabless SD40-2Bs were also rebuilt from standard SD40-2s by the Burlington Northern Railroad in the early 1980s. The units had been in collisions and BN decided that it was more economical to rebuild them without cabs. Canadian Pacific also owns a few SD40-2Bs. These were created by welding metal plates over the cab windows of many of its ex-Norfolk Southern and some of its original SD40-2s.

Additional specifications

Original owners

Variants

SD40T-2

A variant of the SD40-2 was created for several western railroads for extended periods in tunnels and snow sheds. Originally purchased by Southern Pacific and Rio Grande railroads, these were transferred to the Union Pacific Railroad in 1996. They have since found their way into the used locomotive market and many have been sold to regional railroads around the U.S.

British Rail Class 59

Another variant of the SD40-2 was created for Foster Yeoman, a British quarrying and aggregates company, which features a unique body design specifically for the European railway markets. Designated as Class 59 the initial production batch of four locomotives entered service in 1986.

SD40-2W

The GMD SD40-2(W) is a Canadian-market version of the SD40-2 diesel-electric locomotive, built for the Canadian National Railway by the Diesel Division of General Motors of Canada Ltd. (formerly General Motors Diesel) of London, Ontario; 123 were constructed between May 1975 and December 1980.

SD40-2F
The EMD SD40-2F was a locomotive operated by Canadian Pacific Railway. It is essentially an SD40-2 with a full cowl hood. CP was the only buyer, buying 25 units, numbered 9000-9024. Most have been scrapped, but 10 were sold to the Central Maine and Quebec Railway. When CP acquired CMQ in 2020, the 10 SD40-2Fs became CP’s once again. One unit was rebuilt to a hydrogen fuel cell locomotive in 2021-2022.

Rebuilds 
A number of SD40-2s have been rebuilt into other models. Some of the most unusual are the metre gauge BB40-2s for use in Brazil. 

Conversely, several other models of EMD locomotive have sometimes been rebuilt to SD40-2 standards, including the SD40, SD45 and SD45-2. Normally, this consists of electrical upgrades (-2) and replacing the 20-cylinder prime mover with a 16-cylinder version, often built for GE Capital in Poland using EMD's manufacturing drawings and specifications. An outgrowth of this may be GE Transportation's second-sourcing of EMD repair parts. 

The unusually troublesome SD50 have also been rebuilt into the equivalent of SD40-2s, rather than scrapping them.

SD40-3
The Dash 3 suffix is not part of any official lineup, and is a loose designation for rebuilt Dash 2 series EMDs. One example of an SD40-3 rebuild program is the one conducted by CSX. It started in 2010 with 10 units upgraded and numbered 4000-4009; in 2011, 20 units went through the program and were numbered 4010-4029 and in 2012 another 20 units followed and were numbered 4030-4049. CSXT 4040-4049 are painted in the new CSX "RAILCAR LOGO" paint scheme. CSX plans to rebuild 300 locomotives (CSXT 4000-4399). The plan has been to have the new units serve an additional 30 years and cost far less than brand new locomotives. The new cabs can withstand crashes better, have new heating and air-conditioning systems, a new control stand, including visual displays, a modern WABCO braking controller, and modernized starting systems.

SD22ECO 
The SD22ECO is an EMD SD40-2 or similar, repowered with an EMD 8-710-ECO engine.

SD30C-ECO 
The SD30C-ECO is an EMD SD40-2 re-powered with an EMD 12-710 prime mover.

ET23DCM 

The ET23DCM is an EMD SD40-2 rebuilt by GE Transportation, and repowered with a GEVO-6 prime mover. This locomotive meets the EPA Tier 4 emission standards. CSX has ordered 13 rebuilds.

Preservation 
Union Pacific donated SD40-2 9950 to Western America Railroad Museum in Barstow, California in 2004. 9950 was built in 1980 for the Missouri Pacific as their 3320.

In June 2009, Union Pacific had donated 3028 (former Chicago & North Western 6847) to the Illinois Railway Museum in Union, Illinois. The unit still wears its original factory paint from when it was built for the CNW in March, 1974. CNW 6847 was patched by UP in February, 2003, to UP 3028, and retired in December, 2008. The locomotive has since had its UP patches removed, and CNW herald and numbers restored. 

In 2014, Union Pacific traded SD40-2C 3105 and other equipment to the RailGiants Train Museum at Fairplex in Pomona, California for 4-8-8-4 Union Pacific 4014 "Big Boy", which UP restored to operational status in 2019. Locomotive 3105 was originally built in 1979 as Missouri Pacific 6027, and one of the few that the Missouri Pacific ordered with dynamic braking. This is the only operational locomotive in the museum.

In the Fall of 2018, Canadian Pacific donated SD40-2 5903 to the Canadian Railway Museum in Delson, Quebec, making it the first SD40-2 to be preserved in Canada. 

In June 2020, Norfolk Southern donated SD40-2 6162 to the Kentucky Steam Heritage Corp. 6162 was originally built for the Norfolk and Western in 1978 as N&W 6162.

See also 
List of GM-EMD locomotives
List of GMD Locomotives
EMD GT26CW-2, export variant

References

External links 

SD40-2
SD40-2
Diesel-electric locomotives of the United States
Railway locomotives introduced in 1972
Diesel-electric locomotives of Canada
Diesel-electric locomotives of Guinea
Diesel-electric locomotives of Brazil
Diesel-electric locomotives of Mexico
Freight locomotives
Standard gauge locomotives of the United States
Metre gauge diesel locomotives
C-C locomotives
Standard gauge locomotives of Canada
Standard gauge locomotives of Mexico
5 ft 3 in gauge locomotives

pl:EMD SD40
fi:EMD SD40#EMD SD40-2